Murs may refer to:

People
 Marc Athanase Parfait Œillet des Murs (1804-1878), French ornithologist
 Olly Murs (born 1984), English singer-songwriter
 Murs (rapper) (born 1978), American rapper

Places
 Murs, Indre, France
 Murs, Vaucluse, France
 Murs-et-Gélignieux, Ain département, France
 Mûrs-Erigné, Maine-et-Loire département, France
 archaic name of Moers, Germany

Other uses
 Multi-Use Radio Service

See also 
 
 Mers (disambiguation)
 Merz (disambiguation)